Charles Dickens Bold (October 27, 1894 – July 29, 1978) was a  Swedish Major League Baseball player. Nicknamed "Dutch", Bold played for the St. Louis Browns in the 1914 season. In only two career games, he had no hits in one at-bat, playing first base. He batted and threw right-handed. Bold attended Georgetown University.

He was born in Karlskrona, Sweden, and died in Chelsea, Massachusetts.

External links

1894 births
1978 deaths
St. Louis Browns players
Major League Baseball players from Sweden
Burlington Pathfinders players
Swedish emigrants to the United States